Oscar Möller (born 22 January 1989) is a Swedish professional ice hockey right winger who currently plays for Skellefteå AIK of the Swedish Hockey League (SHL).

Playing career
Möller began his junior hockey career in his native Sweden with Spånga IF IK and Djurgårdens IF. He moved to North America for his draft year in 2006–07 to play major junior in the Western Hockey League (WHL) for the Chilliwack Bruins. Producing at a point-per-game pace with 69 points in 68 games, he was drafted by the Los Angeles Kings in the second round, 52nd overall, of the 2007 NHL Entry Draft. He returned to the Bruins for one more season and improved to 83 points, earning him a spot on the WHL West First All-Star Team.  In the off-season, on 22 April 2008, the Los Angeles Kings signed Möller to a three-year, entry-level contract.

He began playing with the Kings in 2008–09 and scored his first career NHL goal on 20 October 2008 against Peter Budaj in a 4–3 loss to the Colorado Avalanche. Midway through his rookie season, the Kings lent him to Team Sweden for the 2009 World Junior Championships. However, Möller fractured his clavicle during the tournament and was unable to make an immediate return to the Kings' lineup.

On 19 May 2011, after completing his entry-level contract with the Kings and with his NHL rights still retained, Möller signed a two-year contract to return to Sweden with Skellefteå AIK of the Elitserien. Möller scored his first Elitserien goal in the season opener against Färjestad BK on 15 September 2011.

International play

In his second year of major junior, Möller represented Sweden at the 2008 World Junior Championships in the Czech Republic.  He contributed 5 points in 6 games as Team Canada defeated Sweden in the gold medal game 3–2 in overtime.  The following year, Möller was lent to Sweden's under-20 team by the Los Angeles Kings to compete in his second World Junior Championships in Ottawa.  He was chosen as team captain for Sweden but was kept from a second gold medal game against Team Canada due to a fractured clavicle, suffered against Russia during the tournament.  Despite not playing in the final, he earned another silver medal as Sweden was defeated 5–1.

Career statistics

Regular season and playoffs

International

Awards and honours

References

External links

1989 births
Ak Bars Kazan players
Chilliwack Bruins players
Living people
Los Angeles Kings draft picks
Los Angeles Kings players
Manchester Monarchs (AHL) players
Ice hockey players at the 2018 Winter Olympics
Olympic ice hockey players of Sweden
Skellefteå AIK players
Ice hockey people from Stockholm
Swedish ice hockey right wingers